René Genin (born 2 July 1931) is a French racing cyclist. He rode in the 1955 Tour de France.

References

1931 births
Living people
French male cyclists
Place of birth missing (living people)